Crișan is a Romanian surname. Notable people with the surname include:

 Adrian Crișan (born 1980), Romanian table tennis player
 Ion Horațiu Crișan (1928–1994), Romanian historian and archaeologist
 Traian Crișan (1918–1990), Romanian Roman Catholic prelate
 Zoltan Crișan (1955–2003), Romanian footballer

See also
 Crișan (disambiguation)
 Crișan River (disambiguation)

Romanian-language surnames